is a 1967 historical fantasy novel by Futaro Yamada.

It is a tale in which Mori Sōiken resurrects other dead historical figures to overthrow the Shogunate, while Yagyū Jūbei Mitsuyoshi rises to fight him and his warriors of the dead.

Plot
The tale starts in the Tokugawa shogunate when Yui Shōsetsu meets the old Mori Sōiken, who, in the story, had survived to the Shimabara rebellion and learned the dark arts of ninpou in order to get his revenge. Knowing they both wish for the dethroning of the shōgun, Soiken forms an alliance with Shosetsu and reveals a spell devised by him, the Makai Tensho, which can rise dead people as his puppets. They soon gather an undead army of legendary warriors and sorcerers, among them Amakusa Shirō Tokisada, Miyamoto Musashi, and Araki Mataemon, and plan to use their supernatural skills to destroy the shogunate. However, the crown of their army, Yagyū Jūbei Mitsuyoshi, breaks free from their control and becomes determined by his own reasons to stop their rebellion before it starts.

Characters
The roster of the dead varies depending on adaptation, but usually contains Amakusa, Musashi, Yagyu Munenori, and Hōzōin Inshun. Soiken himself is often left out in adaptations, which tend to have instead Amakusa as the villain mastermind of the story.

Yagyū Jūbei Mitsuyoshi
Mori Sōiken
Amakusa Shirō Tokisada
Araki Mataemon
Tamiya Bōtarō
Hōzōin Inshun
Hosokawa Gracia
Yagyū Jounsai Toshiyoshi
Yagyu Munenori
Miyamoto Musashi
Yui Shōsetsu
Tokugawa Yorinobu
Tokugawa Iemitsu

Adaptations

Film
 starring Sonny Chiba, directed by Kinji Fukasaku.
 directed by Kazumasa Shirai.
 directed by Kazumasa Shirai.
 directed by Hideyuki Hirayama.

Manga
 by Ken Ishikawa.
 by Shinzō Tomi.
 by Shōko Toba.
 by Naoko Kugo.
 by Masaki Segawa.

Anime
 directed by Yasunori Urata.

Others
, a stage play directed by Kinji Fukasaku.
, a PS2 video game developed by Tamsoft and published by D3 Publisher.
, a stage play directed by G2.
, a stage play by the Herohero Q theatrical company.
, a stage play produced to commemorate the 65th anniversary of Nippon Television.
 featured an adaptation of the story, crossed with Dante's Inferno, as part of a storyline set in Shimōsa.

External links 
 
 
 
 

Japanese historical novels
Ken Ishikawa
Japanese war novels